A1 Televizija (Macedonian: А1 телевизија) or just A1 was a television channel in the Republic of North Macedonia. The second privately owned commercial television station in the country (after Teko TV), it broadcast from 22 January 1993 to 31 July 2011.

Programmes
A1 Television was founded on 22 January 1993, as the first private and independent TV station in Macedonia. The number of employees at its peak was approximately 200 (managing and editorial board, journalists, reporters, presenters, technical staff, marketing, administration) and a large number of correspondents and external cooperators. A1 TV broadcast content in a wide variety of genres including Information, Culture, Arts, Documentaries, Entertainment, Sports and Children's. The main element was the Informative program – central news bulletins at 19:00 and 23:00, short news at 16:00, round tables, interviews and dialogues.

The station's flagship news bulletin was under the banner A1 Vesti A1 News with the central bulletin at 7 pm. It was presented by Tatjana Stojanovska.

According to most television polls, A1 TV dominated as the most watched TV Broadcaster in Macedonia, even more watched than the public broadcaster Macedonian Radio Television. In February 2001, A1 TV was the first television station that broke the news about the 2001 Macedonian conflict, when its journalist Snežana Lupevska and the television crew, who were intending to do a report about the life in that area, were kidnapped by the armed ethnic Albanian guerrilla gunmen in the Macedonian village of Tanuševci, on the Macedonia-Kosovo border.

On 2 July 2008, A1 launched its second TV channel called A2. A2 aired older TV-Serials that have previously been broadcast on A1 and brand new content including TV serials, movies and cartoons.

On 31 July 2011, it was announced that the station has been dissolved following a bankruptcy proceeding due to accumulated debt of over €30 million. The station's owner Velija Ramkovski along with part of the management spent time in detention over the issue for a few months. Velija Ramkovski was then taken to jail by the Macedonian police and has been in jail since.

Nationally created and broadcast shows by A1 TV

Series
 24
 According to Jim
 Charmed
 Chris Colorado
 Commesse 2
 CSI: Crime Scene Investigation
 CSI: Miami
 CSI: NY
 Desperate Housewives
 Dirty Sexy Money
 Edgemont
 Friends
 Grey's Anatomy
 Hannah Montana
 Incantesimo
 Inspector Rex
 Judging Amy
 Justice
 Los Serrano
 Lost
 Lud, Zbunjen, Normalan
 Mad About You
 Nash Bridges
 Nightmares & Dreamscapes: From the Stories of Stephen King
 Nip/Tuck
 Pokémon
 Sleeper Cell
 Spin City
 Stargate
 Smurfs
 Vratice se rode
 The O.C
 The Nine
 The Sopranos
 Vratice se rode
 Una Dona per Amico
 Walker, Texas Ranger
 SpongeBob SquarePants
 Little Einsteins
 Mickey Mouse Clubhouse
 Naruto

Telenovelas
Amar Otra Vez
America
Amarte Asi
Antonella
Casi Angeles
Contra Viento y Marea
Corazones al limite
Cuando seas mia
Dolina sunca
El Desprecio
El Juramento
El Manantial
El Privilegio de Amar
Entre el amor y el odio
Estrambotica Anastasia
Frecuencia 0.4
Gitanas
Hombres de Honor
Isa TKM
Jelena
Kachorra
Laços de Família
Las Vías del Amor
Los Plateados
Mi Prima Ciela
Ne daj se Nina
Muneca Brava
Nueve Lunas
O Clone
O Rei do Gado
Pasion de Gavilanes
Porto dos Milagros
Rebelde Way
Rubí
Salomé
Sve ce biti dobro
Soledad
Te Voy a Enseñar a Querer
Zabranjena Ljubav

Reality shows
Operacija Trijumf
Veliki brat

References

External links
A1 Address

Television channels in North Macedonia
Television channels and stations established in 1993
Television channels and stations disestablished in 2011
Mass media in Skopje
Defunct television channels
Defunct mass media in North Macedonia